Vivian Rich (May 26, 1893 – November 17, 1957) was an American silent film actress.

Career
Rich was born in Philadelphia and spent her early years there. Later the family moved to Boston and she completed her education at the Boston Latin High School. From high school she went to the stage and played in musical comedy before joining the American film company. She lived with her mother in Santa Barbara, California.
 
She was signed by the Nestor Film Company in 1912 and starred in almost 200 films. Rich retired from films in 1931.

Who's Who in the Film World
 
Her entry in the 1914 book Who's Who in the Film World is as follows:

"Miss Vivian Rich, the talented young leading actress of Sidney Ayres Co., American Films, who has made such a wonderful success in such short a time, was born in Philadelphia. May 26. 1894. Her first appearance in the dramatic world was in the revival of the "Country Girl," then playing in Herald Square Theatre. New York; following this engagement she joined the Lux Company and came to the Pacific Coast. She left this company and joined the Nestor. This was her first appearance before the camera. After remaining with the Nestor for some time she attached herself to the fortunes of the American Film Company, and has been with them ever since. Both on the stage and with the silent drama Miss Vivian Rich has made a wonderful success in her calling, and her vivacious spirit, winsome manner and extreme beauty make her one of the most favorite leading actresses on the screen, Some of her most recent successes have been in "The Oath of Pierre," "The Lost Sermon," "Oil On Troubled Waters," "Truth in the Wilderness," etc. Address: American Film Company, Santa Barbara, Cal."

Death
On November 17, 1957, Rich was killed in a road accident in Los Angeles. She is buried in Valhalla Memorial Park Cemetery in North Hollywood, California.

Selected filmography

References

External links

Actresses from Philadelphia
American film actresses
American silent film actresses
Burials at Valhalla Memorial Park Cemetery
Road incident deaths in California
Western (genre) film actresses
1893 births
1957 deaths
20th-century American actresses